Richard Garth Henning (born October 17, 1964) is an American prelate of the Catholic Church who served as an auxiliary bishop for the Diocese of Rockville Centre in New York in 2018, before being appointed as coadjutor bishop for the Diocese of Providence in Rhode Island in 2022.

Biography

Early life 
Richard Henning was born on October 17, 1964, to Richard and Maureen Henning in Rockville Centre, New York, growing up at Holy Name of Mary parish and grade school. His father was a firefighter and his mother a nurse, and Henning credits their examples of service with inspiring his own vocation. He graduated from Chaminade High School in Mineola, New York in 1982. In 1986 and 1988, he earned bachelors and masters degrees in history from St. John's University in New York City before entering seminary for the Diocese of Rockville Center and being sent to the Seminary of the Immaculate Conception in Lloyd Harbor, New York, for priestly formation. On May 30, 1992, Henning was ordained to the priesthood.

Priesthood 
As a priest of Rockville Center, Henning served as a professor of sacred scripture and formator at Seminary of the Immaculate Conception and as episcopal vicar for the diocese. In 2000, he earned his licentiate degree in biblical theology from the Catholic University of America in Washington, D.C. and in 2007 a doctorate degree in biblical theology from the Pontifical University of Saint Thomas Aquinas in Rome.

Bishop of Rockville Centre
Pope Francis appointed Henning as auxiliary bishop for the Diocese of Rockville Centre on June 8, 2018. Henning was consecrated as a bishop by Bishop John Barres on July 24, 2018.

Coadjutor Bishop of Providence 
On November 23, 2022,  Francis appointed Henning as coadjutor bishop of the Diocese of Providence. He was installed on January 26, 2023. In accordance with this, Henning is expected to succeed Bishop Thomas  Tobin as Bishop of Providence when Tobin retires.

Henning is fluent in Spanish and Italian and literate in French, Greek, and Hebrew.

See also

 Catholic Church hierarchy
 Catholic Church in the United States
 Historical list of the Catholic bishops of the United States
 List of Catholic bishops of the United States
 Lists of patriarchs, archbishops, and bishops

References

External links
 Roman Catholic Diocese of Providence Official Site
 Roman Catholic Diocese of Rockville Centre Official Site

Episcopal succession

 

1964 births
Living people
People from Rockville Centre, New York
Roman Catholic Diocese of Rockville Centre
21st-century American Roman Catholic titular bishops
Bishops appointed by Pope Francis